Brian O'Neal Jordan (born March 29, 1967) is a former Major League Baseball outfielder and National Football League safety. In the NFL, he played for the Atlanta Falcons, while he played in MLB for the St. Louis Cardinals, Atlanta Braves, Los Angeles Dodgers, and Texas Rangers.

Baseball and football
Jordan was a sports star at Milford Mill High School in Baltimore, Maryland, and he graduated from the University of Richmond. He was selected in the first round of the 1988 MLB draft by the St. Louis Cardinals. In the 1989 NFL Draft, he was taken in the seventh round by the Buffalo Bills but was cut in training camp.

While he played in the Cardinals' minor league system, Jordan also played defensive back for the Falcons from 1989 to 1991.  He had five interceptions and four sacks in his brief NFL career. He led Atlanta in tackles and was voted as an alternate to the National Football Conference Pro Bowl team during the 1991 season.

In June 1992 Jordan signed a new contract with St Louis giving him a $1.7 million signing bonus to give up football and play baseball exclusively, ending his football career.

St. Louis Cardinals

Jordan made his MLB debut on April 8, 1992, with the Cardinals. He also hit 22 home runs and 81 RBIs. He built on his success in 1996, hitting .310 with 104 RBIs and a .349 on-base percentage, playing mostly as the right fielder and cleanup hitter for the Cardinals. Jordan posted a .422 batting average with runners in scoring position (RISP), which became the Cardinals' all-time highest mark (the RISP statistic has been officially and reliably kept since ), until outfielder Allen Craig topped it in 2013. He also led the Major Leagues in batting average with the bases loaded. In the postseason that year, Jordan hit .333 in the NLDS and had a game-winning home run in Game 4 of the 1996 NLCS.

Shrugging off a  season in which he suffered injuries and hit .234 with no home runs, Jordan scored 100 runs, hit 25 home runs, batted a career-high .316, and had a .534 slugging percentage in 1998.

Atlanta Braves
His stats in 1998 helped earn Jordan a $21.3 million contract with the Atlanta Braves.  Jordan had a strong April and May to help carry the Braves early in the  season.  This propelled him to his only All-Star appearance.  He finished the season with 100 runs again and drove in 115 runs.  In the 1999 NLDS against the Houston Astros, Jordan batted .471, had the game-winning double in the 12th inning of Game 3, and drove in seven of Atlanta's 18 runs during the series.  He contributed two home runs in the 1999 NLCS, but went 1 for 13 in his only World Series appearance.

Later career

He was involved in a multiplayer trade on January 15, 2002. Atlanta sent him to the Los Angeles Dodgers with pitcher Odalis Pérez for Gary Sheffield.

In , he returned to the Braves, spending most of the season on the disabled list with left knee inflammation while rookie sensation Jeff Francoeur took over in right field. Jordan retired as a player after the  season.

Career statistics
In 1456 games over 15 seasons, Jordan posted a .282 batting average (1454-for-5160) with 755 runs, 267 doubles, 37 triples, 184 home runs, 821 RBI, 119 stolen bases, 353 bases on balls, .333 on-base percentage and .455 slugging percentage. He finished his career with a .988 fielding percentage playing at all three outfield positions and first base. In 38 postseason games, he hit .250 (35-for-140) with 16 runs, 6 doubles, 6 home runs, 27 RBI and 11 walks.

Post-baseball
Jordan serves as a TV pre-game analyst for the Atlanta Braves on Braves Live, the official pregame show on Bally Sports Southeast and Bally Sports South. He is active in the Atlanta community with the Brian Jordan Foundation and authored the semi-autobiographical children's book I Told You I Can Play!

In 2009, he was named as a television commentator for the Gwinnett Braves, the AAA farm team of the Atlanta Braves. Jordan was paired with Josh Caray for a 25-game television schedule.

See also

 List of athletes who played in Major League Baseball and the National Football League
 List of Major League Baseball career putouts as a right fielder leaders
 List of multi-sport athletes
 List of people from Baltimore

References

2. http://articles.latimes.com/1992-06-25/sports/sp-1103_1_brian-jordan

External links

Brian Jordan Foundation
I Told You I Can Play! at Amazon.com

1967 births
Living people
African-American baseball players
African-American players of American football
American football safeties
Arkansas Travelers players
Atlanta Braves announcers
Atlanta Braves players
Atlanta Falcons players
Baseball players from Baltimore
Frisco RoughRiders players
Hamilton Redbirds players
Los Angeles Dodgers players
Louisville Redbirds players
Major League Baseball broadcasters
Major League Baseball outfielders
National League All-Stars
Oklahoma RedHawks players
Players of American football from Atlanta
Baseball players from Atlanta
Richmond Braves players
Richmond Spiders football players
Rome Braves players
St. Louis Cardinals players
St. Petersburg Cardinals players
Texas Rangers players
Richmond Spiders baseball players
21st-century African-American people
20th-century African-American sportspeople